Marc Márquez is a Spanish eight-time Grand Prix world champion - six of which are in the premier MotoGP class. Márquez has raced for Honda's factory team since his MotoGP debut in 2013. Nicknamed the "Ant of Cervera", he is one of four riders to have won world championship titles in three different categories, after Mike Hailwood, Phil Read and Valentino Rossi.

In 2014 he defended his title, winning the championship with three rounds to spare, during which he won ten races in a row. Márquez equalled the all-time Grand Prix record for pole positions at the age of 23 in 2016. Márquez secured the 2016 title with three rounds to spare at Motegi, before sealing the title at Valencia in 2017. He also secured the 2018 title with three rounds to spare at Motegi again. In 2019 he secured the title with four rounds to spare at Buriram.

His 84 Grand Prix victories are the fourth highest of all time. His most successful circuit is Sachsenring where he has won eleven times. Márquez's largest margin of victory was at the 2010 German Grand Prix, and the smallest margin of victory was at the 2010 Italian Grand Prix when he beat Nicolás Terol by 0.039 seconds in the race.

Wins
Key:
 No. – Victory number.
 Race – Motorcycle Grand Prix career race start number.
 Grid – Starting position on grid.
 Margin – Margin of victory (min:sec.ms).
  – Rider's Championship winning season.

Number of wins at different Grands Prix

Number of wins at different circuits

See also
 List of Grand Prix motorcycle racing winners
 List of MotoGP rider records

Notes

References 

Grand Prix motorcycle racing riders
Márquez, Marc